Idaea mancipiata  is a moth of the family Geometridae. It is found in Europe und western Asia.

The wingspan is 15–20 mm for the first generation and 14–16 mm for the second generation. Adults are on wing from the beginning of May to the end of June and again from the beginning of August to the end of October. There are two generations per year.

Subspecies
Idaea manciapiata manciapiata (southern France, Spain)
Idaea manciapiata repagulata (Prout, 1913) (Ukraine (Crimea) to the Ural and from northern Iran to the Caucasus)

References

External links

Moths and Butterflies of Europe and North Africa
Lepiforum.de

Sterrhini
Moths of Europe
Moths of Asia
Moths described in 1871
Taxa named by Otto Staudinger